Bosroger is a commune in the Creuse department in the Nouvelle-Aquitaine region in central France.

Geography

The Voueize flows northward through the western part of the commune.

Population

Sights
 The church, dating from the thirteenth century.
 The chapel at Léon-le-Franc, dating from the fifteenth century.

See also
Communes of the Creuse department

References

Communes of Creuse